Quinn Edmond Julian Lord (born February 19, 1999) is a Canadian actor. Beginning his professional acting career at the age of five, Lord played Sam in the 2007 feature film Trick 'r Treat and was nominated for the Young Artist Award as Best Leading Young Actor in a Feature Film for his role as Thomas Whitman in the 2012 feature film Imaginaerum. He had a recurring role in Amazon's TV series The Man in the High Castle.

Filmography

Films

Television

Commercials
Kohl's (2004)
London Drugs (2005)
Capital One (2005)

References

External links

1999 births
Living people
21st-century Canadian male actors
Canadian male child actors
Canadian male film actors
Canadian male television actors
Canadian male voice actors
Canadian people of Welsh descent
Male actors from Vancouver